MIHS may refer to:
 Manhattan International High School, New York City, United States
 Marshall Islands High School, Majuro, Marshall Islands
 Mercer Island High School, Mercer Island, Washington, United States
 Mercer Island Historical Society, in Mercer Island, Washington, United States